The Mont d'Ambin Base Tunnel, also known as the Mont Cenis Base Tunnel, is the largest engineering work of the Lyon–Turin rail link project. Once completed, it will facilitate the principal high speed rail link between Italy and France, conveying both high speed passenger trains and rail freight between the two countries. At , that tunnel will be the longest rail tunnel in the world, ahead of the  Gotthard Base Tunnel. It represents one third of the estimated overall cost of the project and is the only part of the line where work has started.

Crossing the Alps between the Susa Valley in Piedmont and Maurienne in Savoie. It has an estimated cost of €8 billion. During September 2016, a key agreement towards the tunnel's construction was reached by France and Italy. Three years later, competitive tenders to perform packaged elements of the construction work were sought.

History 
During 2002, reconnaissance work commenced on the French side. Initially, access points were excavated at Modane; excavations commenced in Saint-Martin-de-la-Porte during 2003, and at La Praz two years later. During 2011, excavations in support of the survey work started on the Italian side at La Maddalena. Between 2016 and 2017, while full-rate construction of the tunnel had not officially commenced, a  reconnaissance gallery had been tunneled from Saint Martin de la Porte towards Italy; it was bored along the intended axis of the South tube of the tunnel and was driven at its final diameter. It will comprise the first eight percent of the tunnel's final length.

During September 2016, it was announced that France and Italy had reached a mutual agreement for the construction of the tunnel. Furthermore, the tunnel has been approved and part-financed by the European Union, which has stated its intention to finance 40% of the tunnel construction costs, and has indicated its willingness to increase its contribution to 55%, as well as to help fund its French accesses if those go beyond mere adaptations of the existing infrastructure. In January 2017, a treaty was ratified between the two countries, confirming the project's approval.

During March 2019, the Italian government issued a formal request for proposals (RFP) for the construction of the French portion of the base tunnel; in July 2019, a second RFP was released for the Italian portion of the tunnel. During July 2020, it was announced that a consortium headed by the French civil engineering firm Vinci Construction Grands Projets had been awarded a contract for the construction of several major elements of tunnel, including four Avrieux shafts of up to  depth, and the conventional excavation of multiple galleries and seven caverns at the foot of the Villarodin Bourget–Modane decline.

All four of the access tunnels, three in France and one in Italy, have been completed and work began in early 2019 on the artificial tunnel that will be the entrance to the base tunnel on the French side.

In September 2019, the first of eight TBMs to be used on the project finished excavation of the first  of the southern tube of the base tunnel, reaching the La Praz access adit. The  diameter hard rock single shield TBM started its journey in the summer of 2016 from the Saint-Martin-de-la-Porte access adit and managed to maintain an average speed of /day. This first €390 million lot of the base tunnel was constructed by a joint venture of Batignolles TPCI, Eiffage TP, Ghella, CMC, Cogeis and Sotrabas. Egis and Alpina provided project management

Contracts for the Mount Cenis Base Tunnel were awarded in July 2021: 
The approach routes are less advanced; planning is under way on the French side, but on the Italian side the proposed route has had fierce controversy, particularly in the Susa Valley the location of the Eastern portal, with a No TAV (no to high speed rail) movement.

Characteristics 

The Mont d'Ambin Base Tunnel is the principal engineering challenge of the in-development Turin–Lyon high-speed railway. During 2019, it was stated that the tunnel's construction phase had been projected to take approximately ten years to complete.

Opposition to the project is mostly organised under the loose banner of the No TAV movement. Upon opening, the tunnel will be the longest rail tunnel in the world, followed by the Gotthard Base Tunnel, the Brenner Base Tunnel (currently under construction), the Seikan Tunnel in Japan, the Channel Tunnel, and the Yulhyeon Tunnel in South Korea.

The tunnel portals will be in Saint-Jean-de-Maurienne on the French side and Susa on the Italian side. The geology adjacent to the French portal is heavily composed of fractured and sheared coal-bearing schists, as revealed by test drilling, which is poorly suited for using tunnel boring machines; thus, conventional drilling and blasting has to be used for the corresponding  section.

The cost of the joint Franco-Italian section (from Saint Jean de Maurienne to Val Susa) has been estimated at 8 billion euros (in January 2018 value). This cost will be borne by the French and Italian governments, as well as drawing upon European Union (EU) funds. The EU has agreed to provide 40% of the financing, but has indicated its willingness to increase its contribution to 55%, as well as to conditionally partially fund its French accesses. However, a 2012 report by the French Court of Audit questioned the reliability of the estimated costs of the tunnel, as well the projected traffic volumes.

A stated aim of the project is a modal shift from road to rail for freight traffic over the Alps, as well as more passengers travelling by train rather than airliners, both of which achieve a reduction in  emissions.

See also 
Lyon Turin Ferroviaire
NRLA
Turin–Lyon high-speed railway
Lists of tunnels

References

External links 
 
 Lyon-Turin rail link official site 

Railway tunnels in France
Railway tunnels in Italy
Transport in Piedmont
Proposed railway tunnels in Europe
Base tunnels
France–Italy border crossings
Tunnels in the Alps